Carin Bakkum (born 25 July 1962) is a Dutch former tennis player. During her career, Bakkum won two ITF singles titles as well as one WTA and 11 ITF doubles titles. She reached a singles ranking high of world number 141 on 27 March 1989 and on 22 June 1987 reached a doubles ranking high of world number 69.

Career finals

Doubles (1 title, 4 runner-ups)

ITF finals

Singles finals: (2–2)

Doubles finals: (12–2)

External links 
 
 
 

1962 births
Living people
People from Heemskerk
Dutch female tennis players
Sportspeople from North Holland
20th-century Dutch women
20th-century Dutch people
21st-century Dutch women